HMS Astute (P447) was an . Her keel was laid down by Vickers at Barrow-in-Furness.  She was launched in 1944 and commissioned in 1945.

In 1953 she took part in the Fleet Review to celebrate the Coronation of Queen Elizabeth II. Astute was scrapped on 1 October 1970 at Dunston on Tyne.

Design
Like all s, Astute had a displacement of  when at the surface and  while submerged. The submarine was powered by two Admiralty ML eight-cylinder diesel engines generating a power of  each. It also contained four electric motors each producing  that drove two shafts.

Astute was fitted with ten  torpedo tubes, one QF 4-inch naval gun Mk XXIII, one Oerlikon 20 mm cannon, and a .303 British Vickers machine gun. Its torpedo tubes were fitted to the bow and stern, and it could carry twenty torpedoes. Its complement was sixty-one crew members.

Astute was laid down at Vickers-Armstrongs Barrow-in-Furness shipyard on 4 April 1944, was launched on 30 January 1945 and completed on 30 June 1945.

Service history
Astute arrived at Halifax, Nova Scotia on 11 April 1950 for a six-week training period with the Royal Canadian Navy ending on 1 July. Astute spent 21 months in 1955–56 based at Halifax as part of the Canadian submarine squadron, leaving Canada for the UK on 10 December 1956.

As a response to the Cuban Missile Crisis, Astute and sister ship , both part of the Halifax-based 6th Submarine Squadron, were deployed to the North-East of the Grand Banks to warn if Soviet submarines were to be sent across the Atlantic to Cuba.

References

Publications

External links
 Pictures of Hms Astute at MaritimeQuest

 

Amphion-class submarines
Cold War submarines of the United Kingdom
Ships built in Barrow-in-Furness
1945 ships